Vitoria or Vitória may refer to :

People
 Francisco de Vitoria (c. 1483–1546), a Spanish Renaissance theologian
 Alberto Vitoria (1956–2010), Spanish footballer
 Rui Vitória (born 1970), Portuguese retired footballer
 Steven Vitória (born 1987), Canadian-born Portuguese footballer

Places

Brazil
 Vitória, Espírito Santo, capital city of the state of Espírito Santo
 Vitória (island), on which the city in Espírito Santo is located
 Vitória de Santo Antão, city  in Pernambuco 
 Vitória da Conquista, city in the state of Bahia
 Greater Vitória, an administrative unit of Brazil
 Vitória Brasil, a municipality in the state of São Paulo, Brazil
 Roman Catholic Archdiocese of Vitória, Brazil
 Vitória, Salvador, a neighborhood in the Brazilian city of Salvador in the state of Bahia

Portugal
 Vitória (Porto), a parish of the Portuguese city of Porto

Spain
 Roman Catholic Diocese of Vitoria, Spain
 Vitoria-Gasteiz, the capital city of the province of Álava and of the autonomous community of the Basque Country in northern Spain

Sports clubs

Brazil
 Esporte Clube Vitória, a football club in the Brazilian city of Salvador
 Vitória Futebol Clube (ES), a football club in the Brazilian city of Vitória
 Esporte Clube Primeiro Passo Vitória da Conquista, a football club in the Brazilian city of Vitória da Conquista
 Associação Acadêmica e Desportiva Vitória das Tabocas, a football club in the Brazilian city of Vitória de Santo Antão
 Associação Desportiva Vitória, a football club in the Brazilian city of Vitória de Santo Antão

Portugal
 Vitória S.C., a football club in the Portuguese city of Guimarães
 Vitória S.C. (volleyball), a volleyball team in Guimarães
 Vitória F.C., a football club in the Portuguese city of Setúbal
 Vitória F.C. (rugby union), a rugby union club in Setúbal
 Vitória F.C. (handball), in Setúbal
 Vitória–SC (cycling team), a Portuguese cycling team based in Vila do Conde

Elsewhere
 CD Vitoria, a football team based in Vitoria-Gasteiz, Spain
 Vitória FC (Riboque), a football team based in São Tomé

Other uses
 Vitória (2014 TV series), a 2014 Brazilian telenovela by Rede Record
 A Vitória, the name of Symphony No. 4 (Villa-Lobos)
 Battle of Vitoria, an 1813 battle of the Peninsular War
 Spanish ironclad Vitoria, a 19th-century armored frigate
 Duque da Vitória, a Portuguese title of nobility first bestowed on the Duke of Wellington

See also
 Victoria (disambiguation)
 Vittoria (disambiguation)